Sonhy Gessi Sefil (born 16 June 1994) is a Martiniquais professional footballer who plays as a centre back for Lyon La Duchère.

Career
Sefil joined Asteras Tripolis in summer 2016.

References

External links
 

1994 births
Living people
Martiniquais footballers
Association football central defenders
CS Sedan Ardennes players
AJ Auxerre players
Asteras Tripolis F.C. players
Lyon La Duchère players
Oldham Athletic A.F.C. players
Ashton United F.C. players
Union Titus Pétange players
Ligue 2 players
Championnat National players
Championnat National 2 players
Championnat National 3 players
Super League Greece players
Luxembourg National Division players
Martiniquais expatriate footballers
French expatriate sportspeople in Greece
Expatriate footballers in Greece
French expatriate sportspeople in England
Expatriate footballers in England
French expatriate sportspeople in Luxembourg
Expatriate footballers in Luxembourg